James Leslie Dodson (April 18, 1916 – July 25, 1998) was an American football back who played for the Pittsburgh Steelers of the National Football League (NFL) in 1941. After playing college football for Ole Miss, he was drafted by the Philadelphia Eagles in the 14th round (121st overall) of the 1941 NFL Draft. His rights were transferred to the Steelers due to the events later referred to as the Pennsylvania Polka.

References 

1916 births
1998 deaths
Players of American football from Birmingham, Alabama
Ole Miss Rebels football players
Pittsburgh Steelers players
Wilmington Clippers coaches
Wilmington Clippers players